Andrzej Skrzydlewski (3 November 1946 – 28 May 2006) was a Polish wrestler who competed in the 1972 and 1976 Summer Olympics. He was the bronze medalist at the 1976 Summer Olympics in wrestling in the  category (heavyweight). Skrzydlewski was born in and died in Ksawerów.

References

External links
 

Olympic wrestlers of Poland
Wrestlers at the 1972 Summer Olympics
Wrestlers at the 1976 Summer Olympics
Polish male sport wrestlers
Olympic bronze medalists for Poland
Olympic medalists in wrestling
People from Pabianice County
Sportspeople from Łódź Voivodeship
1946 births
2006 deaths
Medalists at the 1976 Summer Olympics
20th-century Polish people
21st-century Polish people